Martinus Johannes "Martin" Konings (15 March 1929 – 28 July 2020) was a Dutch PvdA politician who served as an MP between 1973 and 1986.

References

1929 births
2020 deaths
Dutch politicians
People from 's-Hertogenbosch
Members of the House of Representatives (Netherlands)
Labour Party (Netherlands) politicians